Gerrit Wolsink (born 3 March 1947) is a Dutch former professional Grand Prix motocross racer. He competed in the Motocross World Championships from 1970 to 1981. Wolsink was one of the top competitors in the 500cc Motocross World Championships, placing as the runner-up twice along with two third place finishes. Wolsink is notable for being a five-time winner of the 500cc United States Grand Prix of motocross.



Motocross career
Born in Hengelo, Gelderland, Wolsink was a dentist by training but, chose a career in motorcycle racing. He began competing on the Grand Prix motocross circuit in 1970 as a privateer on a Maico motorcycle. In 1974 he was contracted ride for the Suzuki factory racing team as Roger De Coster's teammate. He finished third in the 500cc world championship in 1975 and 1977 and second in 1976 and 1979.

In 1979 he was the double for Rutger Hauer in the motocross scenes in the Paul Verhoeven film Spetters. Wolsink also competed in enduro events and was a member of the winning Dutch team at the 1984 International Six Days Enduro.

References

1947 births
Living people
Sportspeople from Hengelo
People from Bronckhorst
Dutch dentists
Dutch motocross riders
Enduro riders
20th-century Dutch people